Marguerite "Meta" Claudia Brevoort (November 8, 1825 – December 19, 1876) was an American mountain climber.

Brevoort was born on November 8, 1825, and spent her early years in a Paris convent school.

She made a number of important ascents in the Alps in the 1860s and 1870s, but was thwarted in her two greatest alpine ambitions: to be the first woman to climb the Matterhorn, and the first person to climb the Meije in the Dauphiné. Her role-model and rival was Lucy Walker, who began her considerable mountaineering career at the age of 28, in 1859. In 1871, hearing that Brevoort planned an expedition to the Matterhorn in 1871, Walker quickly assembled a party that included the famous guide Melchior Anderegg, and made the summit a few days before Brevoort arrived in Zermatt. In contrast to Walker, who always wore dresses, Brevoort was the first female mountaineer to wear trousers.

Brevoort was the aunt of W. A. B. Coolidge, whom she brought to Europe in 1865, when he was 15 years of age, and introduced to alpine climbing. Coolidge eventually became an outstanding mountaineer, with over 1,700 ascents in the Alps, and the greatest alpine historian of the Victorian age. The two climbed together for over ten seasons, and were joined in many of their adventures by Tschingel (1865–1879), a small dog their guide Christian Almer gave to her nephew. Later, she would proudly refer to their canine companion as the only "Honorary Lady member of the Alpine Club". She and Coolidge journeyed to the Dauphiné several times in order to attempt the Meije, but encountered bad weather each trip. In 1876, she had her final opportunity for a first ascent, but, instead, stayed in the Oberland in order to give more money to her nephew, to support his efforts in the range.

A few months later, on December 19, 1876, she died at her home in Dorking, England, where she lived with her niece. Her body was taken to Oxford, where she was buried in a grave in St Sepulchre's Cemetery, next to the grave of her sister, Mrs Coolidge.

References

Further reading
 
 

1825 births
1876 deaths
Sportspeople from Paris
American mountain climbers
Female climbers
American sportswomen
American expatriates in France
Burials at St Sepulchre's Cemetery